Savarabad or Surabad may refer to:
 Surabad, Isfahan
 Savarabad, Khuzestan
 Savarabad, Markazi
 Savarabad-e Olya, Markazi Province
 Savarabad-e Sofla, Markazi Province
 Surabad, Zanjan